Ricardo Grimau (born 11 November 1906) was an Argentine sports shooter. He competed in the 300 m rifle event at the 1948 Summer Olympics.

References

External links
 

Year of death missing
Argentine male sport shooters
Olympic shooters of Argentina
Shooters at the 1948 Summer Olympics
Pan American Games gold medalists for Argentina
Pan American Games medalists in shooting
Place of birth missing
Shooters at the 1951 Pan American Games
1906 births